Caitlin Adams (born 7 July 1997) is an Australian long-distance runner. She competed in the senior women's race at the 2019 IAAF World Cross Country Championships held in Aarhus, Denmark. She finished in 69th place.

In 2019, she also competed in the women's 5000 metres event at the 2019 Summer Universiade held in Naples, Italy. She finished in 8th place.

References

External links
 

Living people
1997 births
Place of birth missing (living people)
Australian female long-distance runners
Australian female cross country runners
Competitors at the 2019 Summer Universiade
21st-century Australian women